Acuto is a comune (municipality) in the Province of Frosinone in the Italian region Lazio, located about  east of Rome and about  northwest of Frosinone on a ridge of the Monti Ernici.

Acuto borders the following municipalities: Anagni, Ferentino, Fiuggi, Piglio.

People
Umberto Guidoni, politician and astronaut
St. Maria de Mattias; founded in Acuto the Adorers of the Blood of Christ Catholic Sisters

References

External links
 Local information website

Cities and towns in Lazio